Eustace de Balliol (died 1274), Baron of Kirklington, Sheriff of Cumberland and Governor of Carlisle Castle was an English knight.

He was a younger son of Hugh de Balliol and Cecily de Fontaines. Eustace served as the Sheriff of Cumberland and the Governor of Carlisle Castle from October 1261 until 1265. Eustace married Helewise, daughter of Ranulph de Lexington and Ada de Gernon. He took the cross in 1271 and went on crusade in the Holy Land, as part of Lord Edward's crusade. He returned and learned that his wife Helewise had died. Eustace married secondly Agnes, daughter of William de Percy and Joan Briwere. He died in 1274 and had no surviving issue.

Citations

References
 
 

Year of birth unknown
1274 deaths
13th-century English people
Christians of Lord Edward's crusade